Pholas dactylus, or common piddock, is a bioluminescent clam-like species of marine mollusc. 
It bores into gneiss. It was once a highly esteemed food in Europe.

It is sensitive to light, retracting into its shell when exposed to it.

Distribution
The coasts of the North Atlantic and the Mediterranean Sea.

Ancient history
Pliny spoke of luminescence in the mouths of people who ate Pholas, the rock-boring shell-fish, and of such importance is this phenomenon that it is even said to have gained the first king of Scotland his throne. Hippolytus of Rome tells us that it was a common pagan trick to use the luminescent property of this clam to create the illusion of burning, "And they accomplish the burning of a house, by daubing it over with the juice of a certain fish called dactylus."

<div align=center>

</div align=center>

References

Bioluminescent molluscs
Pholadidae
Molluscs described in 1758
Taxa named by Carl Linnaeus